Chandarana Food Plus Supermarkets, is a Kenyan supermarket chain operated by Chandarana Food Plus Supermarkets Limited.

Location
The Head Office of Chandarana Food Plus Supermarkets Limited (CFPSL) are located on the 3rd Floor of the Lenana Place Building, at 197 Lenana Road, in the neighborhood of Kilimani, in the city of Nairobi, the capital and largest city of Kenya. The coordinates of the company headquarters are: 01°17'18.0"S, 36°47'29.0"E (Latitude:-1.288333, Longitude:36.791389).

Overview
The supermarket chain started in 1964, as a single grocery store, operated by the patriarch of the family, the late entrepreneur Shantilal Mulji Thakkar, with twelve employees. Over the years the business has expanded to 20 stores in major urban centers in Kenya. Three of the founder's sons, Anil Thakkar, Sanjay Thakkar and Dipan Thakkar, run the enterprise.

The company's former group chief operating officer, is Hanif Rajan, a native of Eldoret, Kenya, with a varied retail career in Kenya, Canada, Seychelles and Tanzania. In an interview with Business Daily Africa, in February 2018, Rajan said that the chain owes its success to a cautious, conservative expansion policy, that has saved it from making irrational, emotional decisions. One of the areas that the chain pays special attention to are its suppliers, who deal directly with management, without any middlemen.

The supermarket has remained focused on food items, including in-house butcheries, bakeries, wine and spirits sections, fresh vegetables and sandwich shops. They have stayed away from big ticket manufactured items, such as radios, televisions, refrigerators and cookers. Also, the chain does not maintain warehouses; the suppliers deliver merchandise/produce directly to the store that they supply.

Branches
 the supermarket chain maintained branches at the following locations:
 Highridge Branch: Masari Road Parklands, Nairobi
 Diamond Plaza Branch: Diamond Plaza, Nairobi
 Karen Branch: Karen, Nairobi
 Muthaiga Branch: Muthaiga, Nairobi
 Yaya Centre Branch: Yaya Centre, Nairobi
 Ad Life Plaza Branch: Ad Life Plaza, Nairobi
 ABC Place Branch: ABC Place, Nairobi
 Lavington Mall Branch: Lavington Mall, Nairobi
 Nanyuki Branch: Cedar Mall, Nanyuki
 Eldoret Branch: Rupa Mall, Eldoret
 Signature Mall Branch: Mombasa Road, Nairobi
 Diani Branch: Diani Beach
 Nyali Branch: Nyali Plaza, Mombasa
 Changamwe Branch: Airport Centre, Mombasa
 Rosslyn Riviera Branch: Rosslyn Riviera Mall, Nairobi
 The Well Branch: The Well Shopping Centre, Nairobi
 Kisumu Branch: West End Mall, Kisumu.
 Kakamega Branch: Holden Mall, Kakamega-Webuye Road, Kakamega

Ownership
Chandarana Food Plus Supermarkets Limited is a wholly Kenyan, privately held company. , the detailed shareholding in the company stock in not widely, publicly known.

Controversy
On 28 July 2018, an email written by a new marketing staff was deemed racist for targeting to acquire white shoppers which led to public outrage. Governor of Nairobi county, Mike Sonko moved to cancel the retailer's business licence which the legal experts said was unconstitutional until Chandarana supermarkets was given a fair hearing. The management of Chandarana supermarkets apologized adding that this was not in line with the supermarket's values.

Developments
In February 2022, the Business Daily Africa reported that the retail chain had started to open stores in residential neighborhoods, away from large shopping malls, reversing previous policy. In addition, some stores had started carrying small electric appliances, which was not the case before.

As of June 2022, Chandarana Food Plus was the third largest supermarket chain in Kenya, with 24 retail outlets, behind Naivas Limited with 84 stores, Quick Mart Limited with 51 outlets, but ahead of fourth placed Carrefour Kenya with 16 stores.

See also
Kenya Economy
Kenya Supermarkets

References

External links
Website of Chandarana Food Plus Supermarkets Limited
Chandarana Supermarkets staff get 10pc salary increase plus perks As at 2 November 2015.

Supermarkets of Kenya
Nairobi
Retail companies established in 1964
Kenyan companies established in 1964